Martin Dewey McNamara (May 12, 1896 – May 23, 1966) was an American prelate of the Roman Catholic Church. He served as the first bishop of the new Diocese of Joliet in Illinois from 1949 until his death in 1966.

Biography

Early life 
McNamara was born on May 12, 1896, in Chicago, Illinois, to John Lawrence and Mary (née Hogan) McNamara. He was educated at St. Bride's School and Cathedral College, both in Chicago.  McNamara then attended St. Mary's Seminary in Baltimore, Maryland and the Catholic University of America in Washington, D.C.

McNamara was ordained to the priesthood for the Archdiocese of Chicago by Cardinal George Mundelein on December 23, 1922. McNamara became a professor at Archbishop Quigley Preparatory Seminary in Chicago in 1925, and served as a chaplain at St. Vincent Infant Hospital in Chicago from 1932 to 1937. McNamara was made pastor of St. Francis Xavier Parish in Wilmette, Illinois, in 1937, and named a domestic prelate by the Vatican in 1946.

Bishop of Joliet in Illinois 
On December 17, 1948, McNamara was appointed as the first bishop of the newly erected Diocese of Joliet in Illinois by Pope Pius XII. He received his episcopal consecration on March 7, 1949, from Cardinal Samuel Stritch, with Bishops John Boylan and Albert Zuroweste serving as co-consecrators. McNamara also served as chancellor of the College of St. Francis in Joliet.

McNamara was too ill to travel to Rome to attend the Second Vatican Council. Martin McNamara died in Rochester, Minnesota, on May 23, 1966 at age 70.

References

1896 births
1966 deaths
Clergy from Chicago
20th-century Roman Catholic bishops in the United States
Roman Catholic bishops of Joliet in Illinois
Participants in the Second Vatican Council
St. Mary's Seminary and University alumni
Catholic University of America alumni
Roman Catholic Archdiocese of Chicago